The 1941 Hitchin by-election was held on 10 March 1941. Called in consequence of the death  of the incumbent Conservative MP, Arnold Wilson, it was won (unopposed) by the Conservative Party candidate John Seymour Berry.

References

1941 elections in the United Kingdom
1941 in England
20th century in Hertfordshire
By-elections to the Parliament of the United Kingdom in Hertfordshire constituencies
Hitchin
Unopposed by-elections to the Parliament of the United Kingdom (need citation)